Yarasm (also Romanized as Yārasm; also known as Vāras and Yāras) is a village in Ashrestaq Rural District, Yaneh Sar District, Behshahr County, Mazandaran Province, Iran. At the 2006 census, its population was 76, in 20 families.

References 

Populated places in Behshahr County